Aethes vicinana is a species of moth of the family Tortricidae. It was described by Josef Johann Mann in 1859. It is found on Sicily and in Morocco, Tunisia and Algeria.

References

vicinana
Moths described in 1859
Moths of Europe
Moths of Africa
Taxa named by Josef Johann Mann